The Ministry of Overseas Pakistanis and Human Resource Development, abbreviated as MOPHRD) is a ministry of the Government of Pakistan that oversees matters concerning Overseas Pakistanis and human resource development in Pakistan.

Ayub Afridi is the current Advisor to  Prime Minister for Overseas Pakistanis and Human Resource Development.

The ministry was created in July 2013, from a merger of the Ministry of Overseas Pakistanis and the Ministry of Human Resource Development.

References

Overseas Pakistanis and Human Resource Development
2013 establishments in Pakistan
Pakistani diaspora
Pakistan